Yan Haiwang (born 1939) is a People's Republic of China politician. He was born in Zhengzhou, Henan Province and educated in Harbin, Heilongjiang Province. He was governor of Gansu from January to September 1993 and Chinese Communist Party Committee Secretary of Gansu from September 1993 to 1998. He was an alternate member of the 14th Central Committee of the Chinese Communist Party (1992–1997) and a full member of the 15th Central Committee of the Chinese Communist Party (1997–2002) and 16th Central Committee of the Chinese Communist Party (2002–2007). He was a delegate to the 8th National People's Congress (1993–1998) and 9th National People's Congress (1998–2003). He was a member of the 10th Chinese People's Political Consultative Conference (March 2003–March 2008).

References

1939 births
Governors of Gansu
People's Republic of China politicians from Henan
Chinese Communist Party politicians from Henan
People from Zhengzhou
Members of the 15th Central Committee of the Chinese Communist Party
Members of the 16th Central Committee of the Chinese Communist Party
Alternate members of the 14th Central Committee of the Chinese Communist Party
Delegates to the 8th National People's Congress
Members of the 10th Chinese People's Political Consultative Conference
Delegates to the 9th National People's Congress
Living people